Kriengsak Varavudhi (born 13 September 1948) is a former Thai cyclist. He competed in the men's sprint at the 1968 Summer Olympics.

References

1948 births
Living people
Kriengsak Varavudhi
Kriengsak Varavudhi
Cyclists at the 1968 Summer Olympics
Kriengsak Varavudhi
Asian Games medalists in cycling
Cyclists at the 1970 Asian Games
Medalists at the 1970 Asian Games
Kriengsak Varavudhi
Kriengsak Varavudhi
Kriengsak Varavudhi